Vestnik Evropy (Herald of Europe or Messenger of Europe) was the major liberal magazine of late-nineteenth-century Russia.  It was published from 1866 to 1918.

The magazine (named for an earlier publication edited by Nikolay Karamzin) was founded by Mikhail Matveevich Stasyulevich, a former professor of history, who remained the publisher-editor until 1909; its editorial office "was located in Stasyulevich's flat at 20 Galernaya Street and was one of the centres of St. Petersburg's cultural and political life (the journal's major contributors as well as their friends and associates used to get together on Wednesdays)." The first issue appeared in March 1866; for the first two years it was a historical quarterly, but from 1868 it covered history, politics, and literature and came out each month. "The journal always had a serious, objective, professorial character; even in the most heated polemics, for example, it shunned harsh invective and often even avoided naming its adversary." It consistently supported the zemstvos, judicial reforms, and other reforms of the 1860s, publishing frequent articles on foreign countries and on Russian history that served to promote its own views on contemporary society and politics. It "placed its dark red monthly booklet, 'like a little brick, on the slowly and arduously erected structure of social rights and consciousness.'"

During the heated ideological struggles of the 1870s and 1880s, the magazine tried to steer a course between moderate reformism and the kind of revolutionary socialism it consistently opposed;  Leonid-Lyudvig Slonimsky, a frequent contributor on economic and political topics, wrote a regular "Foreign Survey" which he used "to sketch the outlines of an ideal relationship between liberals and socialists in Russia’s not-too-distant parliamentary future, which involved one group supplementing its program with demands for social reforms and the other abandoning its calls for revolution." In the 1880s, it repudiated state socialism "as a matter of principle, while continuing to build on the arguments in favor of state interference, which it saw
as guaranteeing the people’s welfare"; it also "rejected both the absolutization of the right to private ownership of land and the idea that the land should be nationalized."

Following the 1905 Russian Revolution, many of its members joined the Constitutional Democratic Party, which separated the journal more and more from the radical movement, and in the spring of 1918 its publication was suppressed by the Soviet authorities (the last issue was March 1918).

Among its contributors over the years were the scientists Kliment Timiryazev, Ivan Sechenov, and Ilya Mechnikov; the historians Sergey Solovyov, Konstantin Kavelin, and Tadeusz Zielinski; the literary scholars Alexander Veselovsky and Alexander Pypin; and the writers Ivan Turgenev, Ivan Goncharov, Aleksandr Ostrovsky, Grigory Danilevsky, and Vladimir Solovyov, among many others.

References

Sources 
 Fedyashin, Anton A. Liberals under Autocracy: Modernization and Civil Society in Russia, 1866-1904 (2012), full scale scholarly history.  excerpt
 Saint Petersburg Encyclopedia entry
 Effie Ambler, Russian Journalism and Politics: The Career of Aleksei S. Suvorin, 1861-1881, Detroit: Wayne State University Press, 1972.
 V. A. Kitaev, "The Unique Liberalism of Vestnik Evropy (1870-1890)," Russian Studies in History 46 (2007):43-61.

1866 establishments in the Russian Empire
1918 disestablishments in Russia
Defunct literary magazines published in Europe
Defunct magazines published in Russia
Liberalism in Russia
Magazines established in 1866
Magazines disestablished in 1918
Magazines published in Saint Petersburg
Literary magazines published in Russia
Russian-language magazines
Monthly magazines published in Russia